Kyle Douglas Glen Chipchura (born February 19, 1986) is a Canadian professional ice hockey centre who is currently an unrestricted free agent. He most recently played with Severstal Cherepovets of the Kontinental Hockey League (KHL). He was selected in the first round, 18th overall of the 2004 NHL Entry Draft by the Montreal Canadiens.

Early life
Chipchura was born in Westlock, Alberta.  He played minor league hockey in nearby Legal and Westlock, and attended high school at R. F. Staples Secondary School and Carlton Comprehensive High School during his major junior career with the Prince Albert Raiders.

Playing career

Chipchura began his major junior career with the Prince Albert Raiders of the Western Hockey League (WHL) in 2002–03.  Following his second season with the Raiders, he was drafted by the Montreal Canadiens. On March 25, 2006, Chipchura was signed to a three-year entry-level contract by the Canadiens and joined AHL affiliate the Hamilton Bulldogs to complete the 2005–06 season. In 2006–07, Chipchura remained with the Bulldogs. After posting 39 points in the regular season, Chipchura added a further 6 goals and 13 points in the playoffs to help Hamilton capture the Calder Cup.

In the 2007–08 season, Chipchura played his first NHL game on October 10, 2007. He netted his first goal later that month on October 20 against the Buffalo Sabres.

On December 2, 2009, Chipchura was traded to the Anaheim Ducks for a fourth-round pick in 2011. Chipchura found a checking-line role within the Ducks and posted 6 goals and 6 games to finish out the 2009–10 season. His second season with the Ducks proved less successful, in struggling for a regular roster spot, Chipchura finished with just 2 assists in 40 games.

Released by the Ducks and granted free agency, Chipchura signed to a one-year contract with the Phoenix Coyotes on July 19, 2011.

After five seasons within the Coyotes organization, Chipchura left the NHL as a free agent and signed his first contract abroad, agreeing to a one-year deal with Slovakian outfit HC Slovan Bratislava of the KHL on July 17, 2016. Chipchura in his lone season with Bratislava in 2016–17, appeared in 59 games and posted 13 goals and 29 points.

On June 2, 2017, Chipchura continued in the KHL, moving to Chinese outfit HC Kunlun Red Star on a one-year deal. At the conclusion of the 2017–18 season, having seen his production drop to just 11 points in 56 games, Chipchura opted to return to Slovan Bratislava as a free agent, agreeing to a one-year deal on July 17, 2018.

International play
Chipchura attended Team Canada's selection camp prior to the 2005 World Junior Championships and was expected to make the team despite being only 18 (players up to 20 years old are eligible for the tournament). During practice with the Raiders, however, he suffered a severed Achilles tendon and was not able to be selected as a member of the gold-medal-winning Canadian team.

The following year, Chipchura was invited to try out again for the 2006 World Junior Championships. After being selected for the Canadian team, Chipchura was named team captain by head coach Brent Sutter on December 16, 2005. This made Chipchura the second Montreal Canadiens draft pick to ever wear the 'C' for Canada.

Career statistics

Regular season and playoffs

International

Awards and honours

References

External links

1986 births
Anaheim Ducks players
Arizona Coyotes players
Arizona Sundogs players
Canadian ice hockey centres
Hamilton Bulldogs (AHL) players
Ice hockey people from Alberta
HC Kunlun Red Star players
Living people
Métis sportspeople
Montreal Canadiens draft picks
Montreal Canadiens players
National Hockey League first-round draft picks
People from Westlock County
Phoenix Coyotes players
Prince Albert Raiders players
Portland Pirates players
Severstal Cherepovets players
HC Slovan Bratislava players
Canadian expatriate ice hockey players in Slovakia
Canadian expatriate ice hockey players in China
Canadian expatriate ice hockey players in the United States
Canadian expatriate ice hockey players in Russia